Sigifredo Mercado Sáenz (born 21 December 1968 in Toluca) is a Mexican former professional footballer who played as a midfielder.

He was capped 21 times for the Mexico national team from 1998 to 2002, including three games at the 2002 FIFA World Cup.

Clubs 
  Ángeles de Puebla
  Puebla F.C.
  Club Toluca
  Club León
  Puebla F.C.
  Club León
  Club Atlas
  Puebla F.C.

External links 

1968 births
Living people
Mexican footballers
Mexico international footballers
Association football midfielders
CONCACAF Gold Cup-winning players
2002 FIFA World Cup players
People from Toluca
Club Puebla players
Deportivo Toluca F.C. players
Club León footballers
Atlas F.C. footballers
1998 CONCACAF Gold Cup players